Bent Hansen (born August 13, 1954) is a retired Danish ice hockey forward. He played for 18 years in Denmark for the Rødovre SIK and KSF. He also competed for the Danish national team. His son, Jannik Hansen, also played for the Rødovre team as well as the San Jose Sharks and the Vancouver Canucks of the NHL. During his hockey career, Hansen also worked as a carpenter.

References

Danish ice hockey forwards
Rødovre Mighty Bulls players
1954 births
Living people
Sportspeople from Copenhagen